The 1968–69 Chicago Black Hawks season was the Hawks' 43rd season in the NHL, and the club was coming off a 4th-place finish in the East Division in 1967–68, as they earned 80 points, and qualified for the post-season for the tenth consecutive season.  The Black Hawks then upset the second place New York Rangers in the NHL quarter-finals, before falling to the Montreal Canadiens in five games in the NHL semi-finals. But this season, the Blackhawks missed the postseason for the last time until 1998.

Offseason
The NHL announced during the summer that the league would once again increase its schedule, as it went from 74 games to 76.

During the off-season, the Black Hawks traded team captain Pierre Pilote to the Toronto Maple Leafs in exchange for Jim Pappin.  Pilote had been the captain since the 1961–62 season, and head coach Billy Reay decided to not name a captain for the club for the season.

Regular season
The Black Hawks would start the season off on the right foot, beginning the year with a four-game winning streak, however, the team would eventually fall into a slump, and sit with a 6–6–0 record twelve games in.  Chicago would then get hot again, and eventually found themselves a season high eight games over .500 during their streak, and found themselves in a heated playoff race with the Toronto Maple Leafs and Detroit Red Wings for the fourth and final playoff position in the East.  The Hawks would then fall into a slump, as they had winless streaks of five games and eight games, to fall out of the race, and into the cellar of the East Division.  Chicago would end the year with an over .500 record, as they were 34–33–9, earning 77 points, however, the team finished in last, and missed the playoffs for the first time since 1957–58.

Offensively, the Hawks were led by Bobby Hull, who once again set an NHL record for goals in a season, as he scored 58 times, and he became the second player in league history to record 100 points, as he finished the season with 107 points, which was second in league scoring.  Stan Mikita had another excellent season also, scoring 30 goals and earning 97 points as he finished fourth in NHL scoring.  Newly acquired Jim Pappin fit right in, scoring 30 goals and 70 points.  Kenny Wharram and Dennis Hull also scored 30 goals to give the Hawks five players with 30+ goals in the season.  Pat Stapleton led the defense with 56 points, while Gilles Marotte led the team with 120 penalty minutes, and tied Stapleton with the team lead in plus/minus, with a +23.

In goal, Denis DeJordy saw most of the action, playing in 53 games, earning a team high 22 victories, and a team best 3.14 GAA, along with 2 shutouts.  Backup Dave Dryden played well, earning 11 victories, while earning a team best 3 shutouts.

Season standings

Record vs. opponents

Game log

Season stats

Scoring leaders

Goaltending

Draft picks
Chicago's draft picks at the 1968 NHL Amateur Draft held at the Queen Elizabeth Hotel in Montreal, Quebec.

References

Sources
Hockey-Reference
Rauzulu's Street
Goalies Archive
HockeyDB
National Hockey League Guide & Record Book 2007

Chicago Blackhawks seasons
Chicago
Chicago